Allity is an accredited Residential Aged Care Provider founded in March 2013 with 45 locations in Queensland, New South Wales, Victoria and South Australia. The homes offer all levels of permanent and respite care allowing for aging in place as well as providing secure dementia facilities.

History
Allity was founded in 1992 by Ted Sent. It merged with another retirement village operator, Thomas Macdougall in 1997 with the merged group renamed Primelife. In November 2003 the business was sold to Robert Champion de Crespigny and Ron Walker. By 1998 it had been listed on the Australian Securities Exchange. 

In 2007 Primelife was purchased by Babcock & Brown and renamed Babcock & Brown Communities. In 2008 Lendlease acquired the business and rebranded it Lend Lease Primelife in December 2008.

In March 2013 Lendlease sold the aged care part of its primelife business to Archer Capital and it was rebranded Allity while the independant living retirement villages remained in Lendlease's portfolio.  In December 2021 Archer Capital sold the business to   Bolton Clarke.

Services
The homes offer all levels of permanent and respite care allowing for aging in place as well as providing secure dementia facilities.

The homes range in size from 29 to 224 beds with an ongoing program for refurbishments and reviews across all locations to maintain the standards of both the physical environment of the home as well as the staff’s ability to provide engaging activity programs for the residents.

Allity is expanding their resident memoir program, where year 10 students meet weekly with residents to hear and to write their life stories. The ten-week program has been so successful amongst students and residents of Walkerville that it will be extended to all Allity homes.

Allity is participating in the roll out of a pain facial recognition app, which helps to staff to identify and manage the pain experienced by people living with dementia, who may be unable to verbalize their discomfort.

Allity is partnering with the developers of a clinical pharmacy service that uses a multidisciplinary health care team, patient consultations and DNA testing to create individualized medication plans for residents.

Allity is a significant residential aged care provider in Australia.

See also
 Elderly care
 Aging in place
 Respite care
 Dementia

References

External links
Company website

Aged care in Australia
Companies based in Sydney
Companies formerly listed on the Australian Securities Exchange
Lendlease
Nursing homes
1992 establishments in Australia